"Me Myself I" is a song by British singer-songwriter Joan Armatrading, released in June 1980 as the first single from her album of the same name. The song features jazz musician Marcus Miller on bass. It peaked at number 21 on the UK Singles Chart.

Meaning
Armatrading has said, "I'm very comfortable being on my own, I have no problems with it. I think quite a lot of people have a problem with being on their own, and I think it's quite a healthy thing to enjoy being by yourself. That's really what I was saying. Sometimes being on your own is quite an empowering thing".

Reception
Reviewing for Smash Hits, Deanne Pearson described the song as having "genuine power and emotion. Armatrading comes up with her best single since "Love and Affection"." "The song has a natural running melody that is sometimes absent from her more folky material and the intensity of the lyrics and arrangements are softened to just the right degree, producing a pop song that contains thought, feeling and conviction."

Track listing
7"
 "Me Myself I" – 3:16
 "When You Kisses Me" – 3:14

Charts

References

1980 singles
1980 songs
Songs written by Joan Armatrading
Joan Armatrading songs
A&M Records singles